Rainer Gustavo Olmedo (born May 31, 1981) is a Venezuelan former professional baseball infielder. He played in Major League Baseball (MLB) for the Cincinnati Reds, Toronto Blue Jays, and Chicago White Sox. He was a switch-hitter who threw right-handed.

Career

Cincinnati Reds
Olmedo was originally signed by the Cincinnati Reds as an undrafted free agent on January 21, 1999. He made his Major League debut on May 25, 2003 against the Florida Marlins, striking out as a pinch hitter. He made his first start the next day, against the Atlanta Braves and was hitless in 4 at-bats with 2 strikeouts. He recorded his first Major League hit when he went 3 for 4 against the Marlins on June 1. In parts of 4 seasons with the Reds, he appeared in 171 games and hit .228. He hit 2 home runs with the Reds, the first was on September 23, 2005 against Aquilino López of the Philadelphia Phillies and the second was on September 18, 2006 against Roy Oswalt of the Houston Astros.

Toronto Blue Jays
He was selected off waivers by the Toronto Blue Jays on January 19, 2007. He appeared in 27 games for the Blue Jays, hitting only .216.

Pittsburgh Pirates/Philadelphia Phillies
On February 1, 2008, Olmedo was claimed off waivers from the Toronto Blue Jays by the Pittsburgh Pirates.

On February 26, 2008, Olmedo was claimed off waivers by the Philadelphia Phillies. On March 28, he was sent outright to the minors, but declined the assignment and became a free agent.

Washington Nationals
Olmedo signed a minor league contract with the Washington Nationals on March 29, 2008. He played in 108 games with the AAA Columbus Clippers, hitting .252.

Tampa Bay Rays
He became a free agent at the end of the season and signed a minor league contract with the Tampa Bay Rays in December. In 115 games with the Durham Bulls, he hit .250.

Texas Rangers/Milwaukee Brewers
On December 16, 2009, Olmedo signed a minor league contract with the Texas Rangers.

On March 22, 2010, Olmedo was traded to the Milwaukee Brewers from the Rangers for defensive catcher Matt Treanor. He hit .284 in 114 games for the AAA Nashville Sounds. He filed for free agency after the 2010 season.

Tampa Bay Rays
On January 7, 2011, Olmedo signed a minor league contract with the Tampa Bay Rays. Back with Durham, he hit .260 in 124 games.

Chicago White Sox
After the season, he became a free agent and on December 1, 2011, he signed a minor league contract with the Chicago White Sox. On July 29, 2012, he was called up from the Triple-A Charlotte Knights. On October 10, 2012, he was outrighted to Charlotte and elected free agency.

Tampa Bay Rays
Olmedo signed a minor league deal with the Tampa Bay Rays on January 6, 2014. He became a free agent after the 2014 season.

See also
 List of Major League Baseball players from Venezuela

References

External links

1981 births
Living people
Águilas del Zulia players
Bravos de Margarita players
Charlotte Knights players
Chattanooga Lookouts players
Chicago White Sox players
Cincinnati Reds players
Columbus Clippers players
Dayton Dragons players
Durham Bulls players
Gulf Coast Reds players
Louisville Bats players
Major League Baseball players from Venezuela
Major League Baseball shortstops
Minor league baseball coaches
Mudville Nine players
Nashville Sounds players
Sportspeople from Maracay
Rochester Red Wings players
Syracuse Chiefs players
Tiburones de La Guaira players
Tigres de Aragua players
Toronto Blue Jays players
Venezuela national baseball team players
Venezuelan baseball coaches
Venezuelan expatriate baseball players in Canada
Venezuelan expatriate baseball players in Italy
Venezuelan expatriate baseball players in the United States
2015 WBSC Premier12 players